The Battle of Douvres Radar Station was a military engagement of World War II as part of the Invasion of Normandy, that took place on 17 June 1944. The attack was by British 41 Commando, Royal Marines, the station and area were defended mainly by Luftwaffe ground forces. Preceded by an artillery bombardment and supported by mine-clearing and anti-bunker tanks of 79th Armoured Division, the Royal Marines were able to secure the surrender of the garrison.

Background
The Normandy landings, the Allied invasion of German-occupied France had commenced on 6 June 1944. The radar at Douvres-la-Délivrande was the primary Luftwaffe radar station in the area—a fortified position of twenty acres—having been built by the Todt Organisation comprising five radars with thirty concrete works. Minefields, tunnels, bunkers, five 5 cm anti-tank guns, a 7.5 cm field gun, a number of mortars, twenty machine guns and a ring of barbed wire  in height made up the defences.

At 11:00 p.m. on the night of 5/6 June 1944, the Allies launched intensive jamming of radar frequencies which blinded the German radar network from Cherbourg to Le Havre. On the morning of the 6th (D-Day) the antennae at Douvres-la-Délivrande were destroyed by Allied naval artillery bombardment.

The 3rd Canadian Infantry Division, who had landed nearby on Juno Beach, isolated the station but the Germans defended it for twelve days, awaiting a counter-attack by 21st Panzer Division; on one occasion it was supplied with food by a nocturnal paradrop mission from Mont-de-Marsan.

The Objective
Vollfestungsmässig Gross Suchstellung ‘Diestelfink’: Luftwaffe Night-Fighter Control Center Douvres was located at North 49.287406 Degrees / West 0.40879 Degrees, its five radars operated by 8. Kompanie / II. Abteilung / LuftNachrichten-Regiment 53. (from 04.1943). Located south of the Juno (CA) and Sword (UK) Beaches, its Nachtjagd JaFü Night Fighter-Command Station, became operational in August 1943. Covering the Seine Bucht, operators in an L479 Anton Bunker identified aircraft (bomber stream) course, height and speed, and with intercept data, directed intercepts for Luftwaffe night-fighters. From the Normandy villages of Douvres and la-Délivrande (UK GOLD), its North approach, was secured by Kompanie 12./ Battalion III./ GR 736., and its WEST approach, from Tailleville (CA JUNO), was defended by Kompanie 11./ Battalion III./ GR 736.

The Douvres Radar Station, laid out over thirty-five hectares, was attacked on numerous occasions prior to D-Day; its very strong AA defence being well occupied.  At its primary site were four radars, two Freya FuMG and two Würzburg FuSE, and at its ancillary a single Wasserman sFuMG.  About 238 Luftwaffe personnel operated the site, led by Oberleutenant Kurt Egle (01.01.1944), but on D-Day ‘Wehrmacht Heeres Refugees’ were welcomed from Tailleville, Douvres, and La Deliverande to additionally man the garrison.  A fully developed ‘standard’  Stellung / Suchstellung configuration, it consisted of a fortified main site: Hauptstützpunkt I and a single fortified satellite: Stützpunkt II. Mutually supporting Hauptstützpunkten I: Stp. Douvres I and Stützpunkt II: Stp. Douvres II, operated under a single authority and command, having ‘grown’ in personnel to Battalion strength. The site consisted of standardized technical electronic equipment and operational buildings, combined and laid out following specified distance criteria.  The power for the site radar and associated equipment came from diesel generators, housed in underground bunkers.  As a Coastal Zone Site it was fortified with heavy bunkers (Verstärkt Feltmessig Vf Type 2) for the protection of vital radar functions and personnel, to include a very strong anti-aircraft defence capability, set-out respecting the terrain and ‘potential defence’ of the site.
 Hauptstützpunkten Stp. Douvres I was located at North 49Deg 17Min 11Sec / West 00Deg 24Min 14Sec, and in June 1944 for targeting purposes was at: Lambert Conical MR (1944) Grid 006800 (Ref. GSGS 4250 1:50K: Creully Sheet 7E/5).
 Hauptstützpunkten Stp. Douvres I integrated an Annex, South of ‘la Route de Beny’ at North 49.28432 Deg / West 00.40438 Deg (Ref. GSGS 4250 1:50K: Creully Sheet 7E/5) controlling the East/West Road access to the Station, and defending its SOUTH Approach.
 Stützpunkten Stp. Douvres II was located at North 49Deg 17Min 38Sec / West 00Deg 24Min 17Sec and Lambert Conical MR (1944) Grid 006808 defending the NORTH Approach onto The Station.

Hauptstützpunkten Stp. Douvres I was a solid, reinforced company-plus sized fortified position, incorporating multiple concrete (Verstärkt Feltmessig) Vf LwF Type 2 anti-aircraft Flak gun casemates, with additional Vf observation and Vf crewed fighting positions, it was built to protect the primary radar complex.  A well prepared position, sited to the SW of Douvres, with open and clear fields of fire, a 360Deg arc, it was defended by Kompanie 8. /Luftnachrichten-Regiment (Ln.Rgt.) 53.  Set out in a fully circular design, the site was additionally ‘protected’ by a tactical minefield, 13 meters wide, recorded as KV-Gruppe Riva Bella Minefield: Mf.52.

 Air Defence Crew Served Weapons at Stp. Douvres I
 Type R622 Doppelunterstand Bunker: Twin Group Bunker 1x 20mm FlaK 38 (Open)
 x3 Ringstand: 1 x 20mm FlaK 30
 Luftwaffe Type L414 Schartenstand für 2 cm Flak. (Casemate for 2 cm AA)
 Ground Defence Crew Served Weapons at Stp. Douvres I
 Schartenstand für 7.5 cm PAK 40 - Ringstand: 1 x 75mm PaK Gun
 x3 PAK-Unterstellraum.Ringstand OBW 50mm KwK: 1 x 50mm KWK L/42 Gun
 x3 PAK-Unterstellraum.Ringstand: 1 x 50mm PaK L38 Gun
 Panzerstellung Tobrouk: 37 mm Renault FT 331(f) Turret (H604)
 x2 Ringstand Tobrouk: Vf.Rs58c Heavy MG (schweren Maschinengewehre)
 Multiple Understand: Vf Light MG (x16)
 Air Defence Personnel and Crew Support Bunkers at Stp. Douvres I
 x2 H622 Understand Personnel Bunker - 20 Men (Accommodation Shelter)
 H622 Understand Bunker Personnel - Medical
 R661 Unterstand für Verwundetensammelstelle (Sanitätsstände for casualty assembly)
 Luftwaffe Type L415 FA Wasse Wasservorrats-Unterstand (Water Reserve Storage)
 Air-Defence Weapons and Support Bunkers located at Stp. Douvres I (South)
 Type (Lwf) L410A Geschutzstand mit Zugbefehlsstelle Command-Bunker: 2x 37mm FLAK Guns (Open Roof)
 x2 Type (Lwf) L409A Geschutzstand Emplacement: 2x 3.7 cm FlaK Guns
 Type (Lwf) L413 Understand Bunker: Ammunition Flak Battery 37mm
 Type (Lwf) FA Unterstand für Munition: Gebaude (Munitionstand für leichte Flakzug)

Stützpunkten Stp. Douvres II was a well reinforced platoon-plus sized position, incorporating concrete (Verstärkt Feltmessig: Type 2) anti-aircraft Flak gun casemates, with additional Vf observation and crewed Vf fighting positions, it was built to protect the ancillary radar complex, enclosing one radar.  A well prepared position on open ground, sited to the west of Douvres, with clear fields of fire, having a 360Deg arc, it was defended by Kompanie 8./Luftnachrichten-Regiment (Ln.Rgt.) 53. North of its larger command position, it and was set-out in a fully circular design, the site was ‘protected’ by a tactical minefield, 13 meters wide, recorded as KV-Gruppe Riva Bella Minefield: Mf.100.
 Crew Served Weapons and Support Bunkers at II/ Stp. Douvres
 x2 Type L409A Geschutzstand Emplacement: 2x 3.7cm FlaK 43 Guns Open Roof
 Type L410A Geschutzstand mit Zugbefehlsstelle Command-Bunker: 2x 3.7 cm FlaK 43 Guns
 x4 Ringstand Tobrouk: Vf.Rs58c Heavy MG (schweren Maschinengewehre)
 L486 Understand Bunker (Permanent Radar Station): FA Generator
 L486 Permanent Radar Station - Type FA Generator

The Radars
Vollfestungsmässig Gross Suchstellung Douvres due to its altitude saw it developed as a long-range early-warning radar site in late 1942. The site: Diestelfink / Distelfink (Feldpost No. 32319) came to integrate a Nachtjagd JaFü ‘Anton’ Control Centre with a Funkmeßstellung 1. Ordnung - Primary Radar Site ID F2: 55/56 consisting initially of two Freyas LZs, one Wassermann, and two Würzburg-Riese.  The Freya LZ providing aircraft range and bearings, as its operational partner, the Würzburg-Riese confirmed height and range. The Wassermann, integrating Freya technology, later offered greater range and increased accuracy in azimuth and elevation. Initially Distelfink operators used their radar data to construct a local Hauptlage: Primary Situation Picture, and from February 1944 using additional Flugwachkommando data it produced a composite Luftlage: Aircraft Situation Picture, that it passed to its Jagddivision. Working in a Type L479 Unterstand für Fu.M.G. Auswertung Jafü: Anton, operators used the Anton's ‘Seeburg’ Plotting Room, centered on a large glass table, with a grid-superimposed map, to create its three dimensional airspace model; an average shift requiring thirty-six staff. The Jagddivision produced a comprehensive (Gross)raumlage: Large Spatial Position Picture and took decisions to launch interceptor forces, controlled through its subordinate Jagdfliegerführer (Jafü) for daylight missions or through its Nachtjagdraumführer (Nachtjagd JaFü) during darkness. Distelfink then reacting as a night aircraft control centre (Nachtjagdraumführer) for its assigned airspace, the decision to launch interceptors having been made. For night fighter aircraft control, Funkmeßgeräte-Auswertung: Nachtjagd JaFü DISTELFINK was integrated with Jagdfliegerführer 5 Jafü 5. Nachtjagd JaFü BRUTUS at Bernay in Eure, la Basse- Normandie, it subordinate to 5. JägerDiv Fliegerdivisionen (Stab Paris: Jouy-en-Josas).

The Freya LZ detected aircraft range and bearing, at long distances, but it could not determine height. Freya devices were vulnerable to chaff, along with other countermeasures, limiting them to early warning, not controlling intercepts. Developed by GEMA (Gesellschaft für Electroakustische und Mechanische Apparate), its Freya FuMG 39G was the first operational early-warning radar, FuMG meaning Funk-Meßgerät / Funkmeßgerät / Funkmessgerät: Anti-Aircraft Targeting Radar.
 StP. Douvres I - first lodged a Freya FuSE 80 being replaced by a Freya (Pole) LZ: FuMG 401A (with an increased range up to 200 km). FuSE meaning Funk-Sende-Empfänger / Funkmess Siemens Erkennung: Radar Detector, Active Identification Friend/Foe (Reconnaissance) and Type A. Stationary Ground Installation. The mass-produced Freya FuSE was replaced by the Freya FuMG (1943) at more permanent stations, those not seeing frequent relocations.  Early FuMGs experimented with beam reflection on the ground, leading to a change in elevation angle. This enabled Freya to detect the target's altitude without the aid, of other devices. The Freya-LZ FuMG 401A Early Warning: Anti-Aircraft Targeting. (Lufttransport-zerlegbar / Luftschiffan-Zepplin, Funk-Meßgerät / Funkmeßgerät Anwendung der Bezeichnung, Allgemeine Elektricitäts-Gesellschaft-Telefunken), differs from other LZ versions in being mounted on a concrete foundation was located and targeted at Lambert Conical (MR 1944) Grid 005802.
 StP. Douvres I - also first lodged a Freya FuSE 80 Gemse A/N, (FuSE Detector, Active IFF: Reconnaissance) it was replaced (1943) by a Freya (Pole) LZ FuMG 450 A/N (with increased Range to 120 km). New operator's manuals were written with identical tables of content and they were brief and to the point. They gave a general description of the equipment and a complete checklist for performing all functions.  The Freya-LZ FuMG 450 A/N Early Warning: Anti-Aircraft Targeting. (Lufttransport-zerlegbar / Luftschiffan-Zepplin, Funk-Meßgerät / Funkmeßgerät Anwendung der Bezeichnung, Allgemeine Elektricitäts-Gesellschaft-Telefunken)  Targeted at Lambert Conical (MR 1944) Grid 005802.
 StP. Douvres II saw an inevitable evolution in technology as attempts were made to increase detection range, without changing the Freya transmitter.  Multiple Freya antenna arrays were integrated onto single or twined columns, becoming a Wassermann (GE: Aquarius). This not only offered greater range, up to 300 km, but also more accurate azimuth (bearing), elevation (height) and range (distance).  Towards the end of the war, the FuMG.42 Wassermann WS integrated eight Freya antenna arrays onto two columns, each with four antennae (WS Schwer: GE Heavy).  At StP. Douvres II, a Wassermann Siemens M IV Range: 300 km, (380 km over water) was located and targeted at Lambert Conical (MR 1944) Grid 006809. FuMG 402 Schwer Wassermann Anti-Aircraft Targeting Radar (Chimney: Cylinder 3), with a LwF Type L480 Understand MIV Bunker - Wassermann S FuMG 402 Radar.

Unlike the detector warning Freya, the Würzburg were a tracking radar, the Würzburg FuSE Funk-Sende-Empfangsgerät (Detector, Active Identification Friend/Foe: Reconnaissance) confirming target azimuth and height. The Wurzburg first deployed as an FuMG 39, upgraded as the Wuerzburg-D (FuMG 39 T/D) was one of the most advanced radar used in guiding AA FlaK.  With Luftwaffe designation FuMG 62 Würzburg, it was introduced in 1939/40.
 StP. Douvres I – from the outset housed two Würzburg-Riese (Funk-Sende-Empfänger / Empfangsgerät) FuSE 65 (Detector, Active Identification Friend/Foe).  Built by Telefunken, the Wuerzburg-Riese (using FuMG 62 Parts) with its operators, guided interceptors to an incoming/outgoing aircraft stream, the interceptor located the stream either visually or with 'Liechtenstein'.  The Würzburg-Riese would operate jointly with a Freya, balancing out each other's weaknesses, the Freya picking up targets needed the Würzburg-Riese for exact measurements of location, course and height. The two Würzburg-Riese FuSE65 (Gigant/Gerät) Flight Track - Following Radar (Reconnaissance) were mounted on a Type Regelbau V229 Würzburg-Riese Stand / FuM Riese Radar, sited in close proximity; were targeted at Lambert Conical (MR 1944) Grid 008801.

The Defenders
Commanded by a First Lieutenant (Obtl) the Douvres Radar Station was 'defended' by Luftwaffe personnel of 8. Flugmelde-Leit-Kompanie / Luftnachrichten-Regiment 53 (Air Surveillance Regiment), they much ‘reinforced’ during the day on 06.06 and the morning of 07.06 1944 by soldiers coming into The Station from Battalion III./ Grenadier-Regiment 736./ Infanterie-Division 716., and in the evening soldiers from KGr Rauch Battalion I./ Panzer-Grenadier-Regiment. 192 (mot.)
 Luft-Nachrichten-Regiment 53. was formed in 04.42 to be disbanded in 09.44, as a result of the Normandy Landings. Its Kommandeure: Obstlt Herbert Flesch took command on 24.9.43 at its headquarters Stab in Bernay, Eure having been located from 12.43 in the Normandy Region, Northern France. An Ln.Rgt. was formed of multiple battalions, whose companies manned and operated medium-range detection Freya and short-range interceptor Wurtzburg-Riese.
 II. Abteilung / Ln.Rgt. 53., Gefechtsstand - Lisieux Calvados Department, Normandy, was formed on 04.43 from Stab V./ Luftgau-Nachrichten-Regiment Westfrankreich in a reorganization when Ln-Rgt 53. was enlarged to x4 Abteilung.
 8. Flugmelde-Leit-Kompanie / II. Abteilung - Douvres: Stellung ‘Distelfinken’ was formed from 22./ Luftgau-Nachrichten-Regiment Westfrankreich. Its Führer: Oberleutenant (Dr.) Kurt Egle, Knights Cross (05.jul.1944), was from Mannheim / Baden-Württemberg (12.07.1916 - 27.03.1987). Diestelfinken was a Tier 1. Stellung, its code name derived/selected taking/using the first letter of ‘Douvres’ as the key (the nearest town). The company was assigned to its Stellung (site), operational from mid-1943, employing the Seeburg-Lichtenstein-Verfahren ‘method’, to model a three-dimensional picture for night air interceptions, based on the integration of the ground component radar data and the tasked aircraft's radar.
 Battalion III./ Grenadier-Regiment 736./ Infanterie-Division 716., Feldpost FpNr: 43019 was commanded by Major Pipor. His HQ Stab at Cresserons, was also the Gefechtsstand: KVU-Gr. Luc (KV-Gruppe Riva Bella).  A Bodenständigen: Static / Garrison Bataillon it was equipped with virtually no organic transport, by design or happenstance the Kommandeur Battalion III./ GR 736., positioned two of his companies, in such a way that he would influence the first two days of the Battle of Douvres Radar Station.
 Kompanie 11./ Battalion III./ GR. 736., Kdr Hauptmann Hans Gutsche, with Stab-Zug: South of Tailleville, Second in command: Oberleutnant Heinrich Korzilius. Tasked as Battalion III./ Reserve Kp11., was sited Northwest of Douvres, South of Tailleville: Hinzu kommen Positionen in offener Feltmessige Anlage (Fa) in Type 1 Field Trenches, with 12 MG and one Kp. Mortar. It would hold up a Canadian (8 CIB) attempt to flank the Radar Site and attack it from the Northwest.
 Kompanie 12./ Battalion III./ GR 736., Kdr TBD,  with Stab-Zug: la-Délivrande, was sited on the North Outskirts of la Délivrande and the Western Edge of Douvres, it would hold up the British (4 S.S. Bde) advance down to the Radar Site, manning two Resistance Nests:
 WN 22 (la Délivrande. Hohe 18), at Spot Height 18 was ‘located’ in the village, where the road crosses, above the old railway line. With no (Verstärkt Feltmessig: Vf Type 2) defensive bunkers, it would not be a strong defensible position, with reinforced few houses and Feltmessige Anlage (Fa): Type 1 Field Trenches.
 WN 23a (Douvres.bourg) with no crew served weapon bunkers on the western outskirts, it retains a small (Verstärkt Feltmessig) Vf Type 2 Command Bunker set back into a hedgerow.  A trench runs from it to an integrated trench system in the hedgerows, any defensive works would have been Feltmessige Anlage (Fa): Type 1.

D-Day: D+1
At 11:00 p.m. on the night of 5/6 June 1944, the Allies launched intensive jamming of radar frequencies which blinded the German radar network from Cherbourg to Le Havre. On the morning of the 6th (D-Day) the antennae at Douvres-la-Délivrande were destroyed by Allied naval artillery bombardment.

On D-Day the Canadians had paused in their movement south from the JUNO Beaches, looking for 48 (RM) Commando to move up, secure their left flank, and help to capture the Douvres Radar Site. Standing central to a rapidly filling western Canadian bridgehead, the Douvres Radar Site was to be 'captured - on orders' by a combined force of The North Shore Regiment and X Troop (Royal Marines) of 30 Assault Unit. The most strongly defended position, in the Canadian JUNO Sector, it was not taken on D-Day, its approaches well 'defended' by Kompanie 11./ Battalion III./ Grenadier-Regtiment 736., sited (Hinzu kommen Positionen in offener Feldstellung), astride the D219 and in La Bruyere Wood.

Early on D+1, The North Shore (NB) Regiment (8 CIB) moved South from The Chateau de Tailleville to ‘capture’ the Douvres Radar Station, its support limited to direct-support fire from 19th Cdn Army Field Regt, The Fort Garry Horse having moved over to 9 CIB.  Securing the start-line, 'A' Company having patrolled across its front the night before, quickly ran into an entrenched position, they ferreted-out capturing 38 prisoners, opening a route overlooking les Bruyeres.  Exiting Tailleville, 'C' Company’ moving east of the D219, through broken woods, and hedgerows, clearing a honeycomb of trenches, tunnels, and shelters, it moved up to a hilltop overlooking the (North) Radar Site and Les Terres Noires. Ordered up on the right flank, 'A' Company cleared the west side the D219, fighting hard to get clear of La Bruyere Wood, getting into position, above les Parquets to ‘observe’ the (South) Radar Site.

Taking all day without ‘complete’ success, now only in position to over-watch the Radar Station, the casualty count growing, the North Shores were ordered ‘to clear’ La Bruyere Wood, move west, and bypass the Radar Station. Cleared and secure up to Voix les Moulineaux, containment of the Douvres Radar Site was entrusted to The Black Watch, 5th Battalion, Royal Regiment of Scotland, 4th Special Service Brigade, and 79th Armoured Division (United Kingdom), German troops retreating from the JUNO and SWORD beaches found their way into The Station, strengthening an already strong defence.
 After being rested and reinforced after the initial landings, the 4th Special Service Brigade less No. 41 Commando, moved south to the Radar Station.

Assault

After securing the perimeter, 46, 47 and 48 Commandos were sent to support the Canadians and 6th Airborne division while 41 Commando stayed behind. For the next week, the commandos harassed the strongpoint with occasional mortar fire, RAF rocket firing Hawker Typhoon strikes and volleys from two attached Royal Marine Armoured Support Group (RMASG) Centaur tanks. Although the site did not threaten Allied movements in the area, it provided radar-ranging information for Luftwaffe night fighters and constantly reported on British movements.

On 17 June at 4:30 p.m. the assault began with a bombardment from Royal Artillery  howitzers and Royal Navy ships just offshore. Under their new commander, Lieutenant Colonel Eric Palmer, 41 Commando and forty-four armoured engineering vehicles attacked from the north, while other tanks created a diversion from the south-west. After half an hour of continuous bombardment, the armour advanced with 28 Sherman Crabs (mine-clearing tanks) of the 22nd Dragoons, that cleared the way through the minefields. The 26th Assault Squadron's 17 Churchill tank AVREs with their spigot mortar demolition guns followed behind. At the same time the remainder of the squadron gave covering fire in particular against the supposed targets of the five anti-tank guns. While the Crabs were successful in clearing the minefields, AVRES with their "Flying Dustbin" high explosive bombs caused severe destruction; one hit a 50 mm gun and another an open emplacement at  range. The effect of such fire was devastating to the German defenders.

At 5:40 p.m. the 160 men of 41 commando rushed the bombarded positions and soon after swept over the outer defences. Not long after that they entered the casemates, tunnels and bunkers, opening fire and they found many shocked and dazed Germans. Having taken nearly all the strongpoints, for the Germans it was clear that the station could no longer be defended. With their protective concrete breached the Germans surrendered. The assault was similarly successful on the small station on the Northern site that was found to contain 38 Germans, but almost immediately they gave up; like the others they had been dazed, shocked and exhausted by the bombardment.

Aftermath
The two hundred and twenty seven remaining Luftwaffe personnel, including five officers, surrendered and the last of the 4th Special Service Brigade's D-Day objectives was finally achieved. 41 Commando had suffered six casualties including one killed, whilst the tank crews from the 79th Armoured Division suffered three killed and seven wounded. The Crabs in their successful mine clearing had four tanks disabled by mines, one AVRE was destroyed and another three were disabled during their close-range exchange with the German defenders. With all these variable degrees of damage all but one tank was repairable.

By middle of June, with the last German stronghold near the beaches taken, the Allied stronghold in turn was secure in every way. The front-line was still  beyond the beaches and that meant that Allied naval gunfire could break up any German attacks. Allied air forces, particularly the Typhoons dominating the sky could also break German troop concentrations.

The radar site at Douvres-la-Délivrande is now home to a museum, with two of the bunkers housing displays about the evolution and role of radar. The museum also maintains a rare preserved example of the Würzburg radar antenna.

References

Citations

Bibliography
 
 
 
 
 
 

Conflicts in 1944
1944 in France
Operation Overlord
Operation Neptune
Battles of World War II involving Germany
Military operations of World War II involving Germany
Douvres Radar Station
Commandos (United Kingdom)
Western European Campaign (1944–1945)
June 1944 events